Weissella thailandensis is a species of Gram-positive bacteria. It is a homofermentative, sphere-shaped lactic acid bacteria. Its type strain is FS61-1T  (= PCU 210T = NRIC 0298T = HSCC 1412T = JCM 10695T = TISTR 1384T). Its genome has been sequenced.

References

Further reading
Lahtinen, Sampo, et al., eds. Lactic acid bacteria: microbiological and functional aspects. CRC Press, 2011.

External links
List of species of the genus Weissella

Type strain of Weissella thailandensis at BacDive -  the Bacterial Diversity Metadatabase

Weissella
Bacteria described in 2000